Ankeny is a city in Polk County, Iowa, United States and a suburb of the state capital of Des Moines, as part of the Des Moines-West Des Moines, IA metropolitan statistical area. 
As of the 2020 census, the population of Ankeny was 67,887, making it the seventh largest city in the state. It is one of the fastest-growing cities in Iowa. Currently, the city's incorporated area totals 29.14 square miles.

In 2008, Ankeny was recognized as one of the top ten towns for families by Family Circle. In 2009, Ankeny was ranked No. 62 in MONEY Magazine's top 100 places to live list.

History 
Ankeny was founded as an agrarian community on April 22, 1875, by John Fletcher Ankeny and Sarah "Sally" Ankeny ( Wolgamot) on eighty acres purchased on July 11, 1874, for US$1,600. The town, a single square mile, was formally incorporated on February 28, 1903.

The railroad was eventually laid from Des Moines to Ames, via Ankeny. This rail was completed in 1874 and passenger service established on July 11, 1880, for 33 cents. In the 19th century, the city's industry was primarily agriculture — specifically sorghum and swine production. The former was processed at a nearby mill, while the latter were driven to the market at Keokuk, Iowa.

20th century 
A local newspaper, the Ankeny Times, began publication on May 17, 1902. Utilities continued to slowly develop with telephone service in 1903 and sparse electricity in 1907. Standard residential electricity only became widespread in 1919 after the Central Light and Power Company was authorized to construct a power plant and operate in the city.

Ankeny's first fire department, a volunteer department, was established in 1907 and sparsely outfitted. Four significant fires ravaged the business district (locally known as uptown) between 1932 and 1940, but businesses rebuilt.

In the early 20th century, coal mining became significant as many companies opened shafts and mines near the city in 1903, 1907, and 1908. The Enterprise Coal Company utilized Ankeny as a company town and went on to produce over 100,000 tons of coal in 1914, ranking among the top 24 coal producers in the state. In 1912, United Mine Workers Local 2476 in Ankeny had 246 members, over half of the total population at the time, and Local 2511 in Enterprise had 395 members.

World War II and Post-War 
Prior to the 1930s, most of the land in Ankeny found agricultural use: however, manufacturing became increasingly significant. In the 1940s, amidst World War II, the US federal government vacated and seized farms via eminent domain in 1941 for the construction of a military ordnance plant. The plant was fully operational from 1942 until being put on standby on V.E. Day, 1945 and officially closed immediately prior to VP day.

Post-World War II, Deere & Company purchased the factory in 1947, which began to manufacture agricultural equipment under the new name John Deere Des Moines Works. The rest of the land surrounding the plant was purchased by Iowa State University for agricultural research.

In 1958, mail delivery to residences began. The same year, a second local newspaper, the Ankeny Press-Citizen, began publication on October 1. The city's status was upgraded in 1961 from town to city by the state and federal government. In 1966, the Ankeny Times stopped publication.

Later 20th century 
In August 1967, Des Moines Area Community College purchased 240 acres on the southeast of the Iowa State University plot: construction began in 1968 on a new main campus ( Ankeny Campus). Construction on main facilities continued through the 1970s. Also in the summer of 1967, Faith Baptist Bible College and Theological Seminary was established in Ankeny. The college was formerly based in Omaha, Nebraska and known as Omaha Bible Institute (OBI) and Omaha Baptist Bible College (OBBC).

An F4 tornado struck the city in June 1974, along with Des Moines, Pleasant Hill, Runnells, Boundurant, and Carlisle. Casualties totaled two dead and fifty injured. Local Ankeny stores offered discounts in the wake of the tornado.

In 1989, public and private interests began planning for a local airport in northeast Polk County. Ankeny Regional Airport, the result of the project, opened in February 1994, with the first flight being a Cessna 182 Skylane.

21st century 
In 2003, changes in Iowa state law allowed Iowa State University to sell off its research plot near Ankeny, which it did to the city in June 2005 for $23.6 million. The year prior, in 2004, the city government requested proposals for a new district called Prairie Trail to be created on the plot. Later in September 2005, the city sold the land to Dennis Albaugh, whose company submitted the chosen proposal, for the same price. The city agreed to invest up to $20 million in basic infrastructure for the district, which Albaugh's company agreed to match and enter into a Civic Trust Fund to be used for public facilities.

In May 2017, an $8.5 million bond referendum was successfully held to create a new, modern library. The project, having an overall budget of $25 million, broke ground on July 1, 2018. The old Kirkendall Public Library had been used since 1996 and had  while the new library has  of space. The new Kirkendall Public Library opened in February 2020.

Geography 
Ankeny is located in north-central Polk County. It is bordered on the east by Interstate 35, with U.S. Route 69 running through the center of the town. Most of the area of Ankeny is dry land with a small number of park ponds and streams. The City itself states that  of that land is incorporated.

Like most of Polk County, Ankeny exists at the bottom area of the Des Moines Lobe, a topographical landscape area, in an area known as the Bemis Advance. The Lobe was formed during the Wisconsin glaciation leaving significant deposits resulting in an area with low relief.

The upper sediments Ankeny sits upon are primarily a variable mixture of silt, sand, gravel, and loam types less than 8 meters in depth. The water table is seasonally elevated. The bedrock the city sits on is part of the Cherokee Group and composed of primarily grey shale and sandstone, with secondary black shale, coal, and mudstone.

Climate

According to the Köppen Climate Classification system, Ankeny has a hot-summer humid continental climate, abbreviated "Dfa" on climate maps.

Demographics 

Since the city's first census results in 1910 of 445 inhabitants, Ankeny's population has grown to an estimated 67,887 people in 2020, an increase of 48% from the 45,562 of the 2010 census, which itself was a 68.1% increase from 2000.

Ankeny has been noted multiple times in recent years by the Census Bureau for rapid population growth, being listed as the fourth fastest growing city July 2016 – 2017 with a growth rate of 6.4% and the tenth fastest growing July 2017 – 2018 with a growth rate of 4.6%. To keep pace with growing population numbers, the city has requested a special census every decade since the 1970s in 1975, 1985, 1994, 2005, and 2014.

High growth rates have led to nearly 80% of Ankeny residents surveyed in 2018 to agree the city's population growth was "somewhat too fast" or "much too fast". The growth has also led to infrastructure strain and challenges.

2010 decennial census 
As of the 2010 United States Census, there were 45,582 people, 17,433 households, and 12,087 families residing in the city. The racial makeup of the city was 94.7% White, 1.2% African American, 0.1% Native American, 2.0% Asian, 0.1% Pacific Islander, 0.6% from other races, and 1.3% from two or more races. Hispanic or Latino of any race were 2.3% of the population.

There were 17,433 households, of which 38.4% had children under the age of 18 living with them, 58.9% were married couples living together, 7.2% had a female householder with no husband present, 3.2% had a male householder with no wife present, and 30.7% were non-families. 22.6% of all households were made up of individuals, and 6.2% had someone living alone who was 65 years of age or older. The average household size was 2.58 and the average family size was 3.08.

The median age in the city was 31.9 years. 27.7% of residents were under the age of 18; 9.1% were between the ages of 18 and 24; 33.7% were from 25 to 44; 21.1% were from 45 to 64; and 8.3% were 65 years of age or older. The gender makeup of the city was 49.0% male and 51.0% female.

Regarding household income, the median income was $51,914 while average income was $70,883. Family income had a median of $62,982 and average of $82,446. Among full-time, year-round workers, the median earnings were $46,478 for men and $36,040 for women. Poverty affecting families was present at a 10.1% general rate with a 28.9% rate of families run by single mothers. Poverty affected 13.8% of inhabitants, 19.2% of minor inhabitants, and 12.1% of those 18 years old and older.

2014 special census 
In 2014, a special census was held by decision of the city, which it spent $825 thousand to have. This census was completed on December 12, 2014, and listed a new official population count of 54,598 inhabitants and 21,918 households, an increase of 19.7% and 25.7% respectively to the 2010 decennial census. Increased population numbers allows the city to accrue an estimated $4.5 million more in allocated state funding for road construction and repairs.

2020 decennial census 
As of the 2020 United States Census, there were 67,887 people and 24,532 households residing in the city. The racial makeup of the city was 93.4% White, 1.4% African American, 0.1% Native American, 2.3% Asian, 0.6% from other races, and 2.6% from two or more races. Hispanic or Latino of any race were 2.8% of the population.

There were 24,532 households, of which 27.3% had children under the age of 18 living with them. The average household size was 2.61.

Regarding household income, the median household income was $89,484 while per capita income was $41,784. Poverty affected 4.6% of families.

Economy 

The Ankeny city government's fiscal year 2020 budget listed total property values of $779 million in commercial, $177 million in industrial, $56 million in utilities, $113 million in multi-residential, and $4.64 billion in residential property. The median home value is $197,500. In 2018, the budget reads, Ankeny "saw one of its best years for construction activity" with commercial construction valued $71 million and residential construction valued $173 million. The number of businesses in Ankeny for the year totaled 5,089 with $972 million in taxable retail sales.

The largest businesses by highest taxable valuation are as follows: Deere & Company ($42.6 million), DRA Properties, LC ($36 million), Mid-American Energy ($27.4 million), DLE Seven, LLC ($24 million), Casey's General Stores ($23.3 million), Hurd Fleet, LLC ($21.7 million), Denny Elwell Family, LC ($20.8 million), B&G Foods North America ($19.9 million), Woodland Reserve Apartments, LC ($19.9 million), and Perishable Distributors of Iowa, Ltd. (a Hy-Vee subsidiary) ($17.3 million).

The largest employers by number of employees are as follows: Ankeny Community Schools (1,965), Deere & Company (1,900), Casey's General Stores (1,260), the City of Ankeny (786), Perishable Distributors of Iowa, Ltd. (687), Des Moines Area Community College (611), Baker Group (560), Purfoods (517), B&G Foods North America (400), and Accumold (350).

Industry-wise, the largest percentages of industry occupation are as follows: education and health care services (23.34%), finance, insurance, and real estate (14.07%), retail (11.99%), professional services (9.03%), entertainment and recreation (7.81%), manufacturing (7.77%), construction (5.59%), other services (5.13%), public administration (4.81%), transportation, warehousing, and utilities (3.71%), wholesale (3.68%), agriculture (1.78%), information and data (1.29%).

The United States Census Bureau estimates that between 2013 and 2017 that 78.7% of the population 16 years old and older were part of the civilian labor force with 73.4% specifically for women.

Previously in 2012, the Census Bureau's Survey of Business Owners (SBO) reported that 4,388 businesses called Ankeny home with a total reported $8.081 billion in business and $748 million in annual payroll. Of those businesses, the reported industries were 619 construction, 143 wholesale, 547 retail, 198 transportation and warehousing, 93 data and information technology, 279 finance and insurance, 491 real estate and rental, 478 professional, scientific, and technical services, and 248 administrative, supportive, waste management, and remediation.

Parks and recreation 
There was previously a YMCA in Ankeny, of the YMCA of Greater Des Moines.  On March 1, 2019, that YMCA closed due to problems with funding and a decline in the number of members.

Public and private parks 
Ankeny currently has "60 parks covering over 800 acres with a mixture of recreational facilities" which include athletic facilities, playgrounds, green spaces, picnic shelters, two aquatic centers, two community centers, a dog park, bandshell, skate park, disc golf course, and more. Ankeny has many trail areas in the city totaling over 100 miles of length. The city has two sports complexes. The larger Prairie Ridge Sports Complex comprises 124 acres and provides well-maintained fields for a variety of ball sports. Many public and private sports organizations and teams base themselves at the complex which serves over 6,500 youth athletes. The smaller Hawkeye Park Sports Complex features a handful of fields typically used for adult leagues and individual recreational use. In addition, the city operates Otter Creek Golf Course, a 200.6 acre facility, as a public golf venue.

The city puts on a variety of recreational programs year-round, sometimes involving school district facilities, which range from all-ages athletic teams and training, senior citizen activities, seasonal/holiday events, dances, first aid and CPR training, arts and crafts, public yoga, charter bus expeditions, and basic skills. Artistic and cultural organizations also exist within the city such as the Ankeny Area Historical Society, Ankeny Art Center, Ankeny Community Band, Ankeny Community Chorus, Ankeny Community Theatre, and Art for Ankeny.

Miracle Park, a  playground, is an "all-inclusive" facility specifically designed to accommodate special needs youth. Designed in 2015, the Park adjoins the nearby Ankeny Miracle League baseball field, which provides a location for a local special needs baseball league.

In 2019, the city estimates 160,000 attendees to the two aquatic centers during the summer season, over 14,000 sports events held at the two complexes, over 36,000 participants in public programming (with about 7,600 of those in senior citizen programs), and 29,300 rounds of golf played at Otter Creek.

Government 

The city code of Ankeny specifies the municipal governance is in the form of a Mayor–council government while the description in city documents describes the city as "Mayor/Council/Manager". The Mayor and City Council officers are elected for four year terms with Council terms overlapping. Any elected positions in the city fall under Chapter 376 of the Code of Iowa.

Mayor 
The current Mayor of Ankeny is Mark Holm. Holm, a former City Council member, was elected in November 2021 and took office in January 2022.

The office of Mayor, as listed in the city code, acts as the city CEO and supervises the whole of city governance, representing the city, working as President of the City Council, and appointing officers and officials. The baseline mayoral salary is $10,000 yearly plus expense reimbursement. In regards to Council legislation, the Mayor may only approve, veto, or disregard, never voting on the legislation. The Mayor also appoints one of the members of the council as Mayor Pro Tem.

City council 
The city council consists of five members. The current members are Bobbi Bentz (Mayor Pro Tem), Kelly Whiting, Jeff Perry, Todd Shafer, and Joe Ruddy.

The council maintains local legal, economic, civic, and public authority over the city, as well as appointing city officers. One member of the council is appointed by the Mayor as Mayor Pro-Tem whom also serves as vice-president of the council and discharges the Mayor's duties if absent or unable. Mayor veto of Council decisions can be overridden by supermajority. Councilor salaries are $7,000 yearly.

Education

Primary and secondary 
Ankeny features both public and private institutions for primary and secondary education.

Ankeny Community School District 

Ankeny's public school district is the sixth largest district of its kind in the state with an approximate $190 million yearly budget. It currently educates nearly 12,000 students and employs over 1,500. It serves most of the city limits.  The district encompasses sixteen school buildings and has two feeder systems with corresponding institutions.  In 2013, the community school district split into the current two high school system. The district slowly split incoming students into separate systems until the full split was made in 2013. Prior to the split, Ankeny's universal mascot was the Hawk, with the Jaguar being introduced with the new secondary system based around Ankeny Centennial High School.

Other public 
A portion of southern Ankeny on the edge of the city limits is in the Saydel Community School District.

Private 
Ankeny Christian Academy ( ACA) is a private, accredited, and non-denominational Christian school that offers both primary and secondary schooling, as well as preschool. The school was established in February 1992 and opened its doors in August 1993, moving to its current 1604 West 1st Street location in early 2000.

St. Luke the Evangelist Catholic School was opened in August 2015 by the Diocese of Des Moines on the western side of the city at 1102 NW Weigel The initial school and church building had a cost of $8.2 million. Dr. The school initially housed K-3rd grade students. Each year following, a new grade is added until it serves K-8th grade students in 2020. On October 21, 2021, a groundbreaking was held for an expansion with a cost of $3.5 million, with $3.2 million paid through cash and gifts. The area Catholic high school is Dowling Catholic High School in West Des Moines.

Post-secondary 
Ankeny hosts a variety of public and private post-secondary education institutions.

 Public
Des Moines Area Community College ( DMACC) has been based in the city since creation of the Ankeny Campus in the summer of 1967. The Campus currently educates over 15,000 students on their 304-acre plot and offers a large variety of degree, diploma, and certificate programs. Since its inception, the college has been undergoing near-constant additions and renovations. Many other campuses exist across the state under the direction of the Ankeny Campus.

Iowa State University formerly operated a research farm in south Ankeny. However, that land was sold off in 2005 and is now being developed as the Prairie Trail district.

 Private
Faith Baptist Bible College and Theological Seminary, the oldest private college in Ankeny, has been an institution in the city since 1967. Originally founded as the Omaha Bible Institute in 1921, the college changed names to the Omaha Baptist Bible College in 1960, before moving from Omaha, Nebraska to Ankeny in the summer of 1967. The graduate-level seminary was added in January 1986.

Upper Iowa University, based in Fayette, Iowa, operates an extension facility in the city at 1535 SE Delaware Ave.

Infrastructure

Transportation 
The city of Ankeny lists, as of 2018, 543 miles of road, 369 cul-de-sacs, 6,238 street lights, and 72 traffic signals on city roadways.

Ankeny Regional Airport, a public, non-commercial airport, provides air access to Ankeny and has since 1994. The airport currently claims to be the state's third-busiest and allows corporate, individual, and freight use. It is a relief airport for Des Moines International Airport.

Des Moines Area Regional Transit ( DART), a public transit agency, operates an express bus route between Ankeny and Des Moines. The route includes stops at DMACC's Ankeny Campus and the High Trestle Trail trailhead in the city. Additionally, the agency operates on-call shuttle services in the city as well.

Notable people 

 Dennis Albaugh (born 1949) Owner, CEO of Albaugh Inc., No. 468 on Forbes 2009 list of World's Billionaires
 Carmine Boal (born 1956), former Republican Iowa State Representative
 Chris Fehn (born 1972), musician and member of Slipknot, a Grammy Award-winning heavy metal band
 Jeff Lamberti (born 1962), former Republican Iowa Senator and State Representative
 Larry Noble, former Republican Iowa Senator
Justin Phongsavanh, F54 Paralympic javelin thrower
 Paul Rhoads (born 1967), college football coach, head coach at Iowa State University from 2009 to 2015.
 James Root (born 1971), musician and rhythm/lead guitarist of heavy metal band Slipknot, and the lead guitarist for the rock band Stone Sour
 Connie Yori (born 1963), former head coach of the Nebraska Cornhuskers women's basketball team

See also

References

External links 

 Official Ankeny City Website
 Ankeny Chamber of Commerce
 Ankeny Economic Development Corporation

 
1903 establishments in Iowa
Cities in Iowa
Cities in Polk County, Iowa
Company towns in Iowa
Des Moines metropolitan area
Populated places established in 1874
1874 establishments in Iowa